Lauren Zoe Hernandez (born June 9, 2000) is an American artistic gymnast. During her debut year as a senior gymnast, she competed as a member of the U.S. women's gymnastics team dubbed the "Final Five" at the 2016 Summer Olympics; Ultimately, the U.S. won gold in the team event. In the individual events, Hernandez earned the silver medal on the balance beam. She returned to training in late 2018 and expressed interest in making a comeback to earn a spot on the U.S. women's gymnastic team for the Tokyo Olympics in 2021, but she did not qualify for the Olympic Gymnastics Trials.

Outside of gymnastics, Hernandez has appeared on season 23 of Dancing with the Stars in 2016, where she won the competition along with partner Val Chmerkovskiy. Hernandez hosted the first season of American Ninja Warrior Junior as the on-course reporter and starred as Valeria in the Nickelodeon animated miniseries Middle School Moguls. She is the author of two books, I Got This: To Gold and Beyond, a New York Times Bestseller and She's Got This, a children's book.

Personal life 
Hernandez was born in Old Bridge Township, New Jersey, the daughter of Wanda and Anthony Hernandez, both from Puerto Rico. She attended Abeka Academy High School in Old Bridge, New Jersey. She has a sister, Jelysa, and a brother, Marcus, who graduated from Rutgers University-New Brunswick in 2018. She is of Puerto Rican descent. She has been dating fellow gymnast Charlotte Drury since December 2020.

Gymnastics career

Junior career

2012
Hernandez's elite career started in 2012 at the U.S. Classic, where she placed 11th in the junior division. Through the Classic, she qualified to the National Championships in St. Louis, where she placed 21st after two days of competition.

2013
Hernandez's first meet of the 2013 season was the WOGA Classic, won the silver medal in the all-around behind Meredith Sylvia. In June, she competed at the American Classic in Huntsville, Texas. There, she placed first on floor exercise, second in the all-around behind Ariana Agrapides, and third on balance beam and vault.

Following a national training camp, in July 2013 Hernandez was added to the U.S. junior national team. She then went to Chicago for the U.S. Classic, where she placed sixth all-around and won the floor exercise title. At the National Championships in August, she won the silver medal in the junior all-around competition with a total score of 116.650, behind Bailie Key. She also placed second on uneven bars and floor exercise, and tied for third on beam with Alexis Vasquez.

In September, Hernandez was selected to represent the U.S. at the Junior Japan International in Yokohama. She scored 56.750 to win the bronze medal in the all-around. She also took third on vault, fourth on floor exercise, and sixth on balance beam. In November, she competed at the International Junior Mexican Cup in Acapulco alongside Bailie Key, Veronica Hults, and Emily Gaskins, and they won the team gold medal. Individually, Hernandez won the silver medal in the all-around behind Key.

2014
In early 2014, Hernandez fractured her wrist when she slipped off the beam in a training session. She returned to competition soon after the injury but then suffered a torn patellar tendon and dislocated kneecap, resulting in six months out of gymnastics. She resumed training in the fall and attended the final U.S. training camp of the year in November.

2015
Hernandez was named to the U.S. team for the 2015 City of Jesolo Trophy, where she was crowned junior all-around champion with a score of 57.650, ahead of teammates Norah Flatley and Jazmyn Foberg. In the junior-division event finals, she earned additional gold medals on the uneven bars, with a score of 14.500, and the floor exercise, with a score of 14.650.

At the 2015 U.S. Classic in July, Hernandez won the junior all-around title with a score of 58.450, as well as winning vault (14.900) and uneven bars (15.000). She placed third on balance beam (14.200) and floor exercise (14.350, tied with Deanne Soza).

At the National Championships, she had a score of 57.900 on the first day of competition and 59.550 on the second day, winning the junior all-around title over defending champion Foberg. She also won the title on the uneven bars with a combined two-day score of 30.100, silver on the floor exercise, and bronze on balance beam and vault.

Hernandez was then selected to compete at the 2015 International Junior Japan Meet in Yokohama, where she won the all-around, floor exercise, and vault and won silver medals on balance beam and uneven bars.

Senior career

2016
Hernandez made her senior debut in 2016 at the City of Jesolo Trophy in Jesolo, Italy, where the U.S. team won the gold medal. Hernandez won the bronze medal in the all-around with a score of 58.550, behind two U.S. teammates, fellow first-year senior Ragan Smith and Gabby Douglas, the 2012 Olympic all-around champion. She also earned a silver medal on vault and a gold medal on balance beam, ahead of Smith and 2012 Olympian Aly Raisman.

In April, Hernandez competed at the Pacific Rim Gymnastics Championships in Everett, Washington along with Raisman, Smith, three-time world all-around champion Simone Biles, and 2015 World Championships team member Brenna Dowell. She contributed an all-around score of 59.800 toward the American team's first-place finish and placed third individually behind Biles and Raisman, but did not earn the all-around bronze medal because of a rule limiting medals to two gymnasts per country (Japan's Nagi Kajita took bronze instead). Hernandez also qualified for the balance beam final, but USA Gymnastics announced that she and Biles would not compete in event finals in order to rest them before the Olympics.

In June, Hernandez competed at the U.S. Classic on bars only, scoring 15.400. Later that month, she competed all four events at the National Championships. At the end of night one, she was tied for second place in the all-around with Raisman, behind Biles, with a score of 60.450. On night two, she scored 14.800 on vault, 15.150 on uneven bars, 15.300 on balance beam, and 14.800 on floor exercise. She finished the two-day competition in third all-around, behind Biles and Raisman. She placed third on uneven bars and balance beam, and tied for third on floor exercise with MyKayla Skinner.

At the Olympic Trials in early July, Hernandez placed second in the all-around, behind Biles. She was named to the Olympic team alongside Biles, Douglas, Raisman and Madison Kocian.

In 2014, Hernandez committed to the University of Florida to compete on the Florida Gators gymnastics team in the NCAA. However, she decided to forgo NCAA eligibility and become a professional athlete on August 3, 2016, in the lead-up to the Olympic Games.

Rio de Janeiro Olympics

On August 7, Hernandez competed in the women's qualification at the 2016 Summer Olympics, where the top eight teams advance to the team finals. Hernandez scored a 15.200 on vault, a 15.366 on balance beam, and a 14.800 in floor exercise, qualifying to the balance beam event finals in second place. She posted the fourth highest score on floor, but did not advance to the final due to the two-per-country rule, with teammates Biles and Raisman getting higher scores. Hernandez did not compete on uneven bars. The United States team finished first in team qualifications, securing a spot in team finals with a score of 185.238.

On August 9, Hernandez and the rest of the United States team, known as the Final Five, won gold in the team competition. The Americans won every event, scoring a total of 184.897, more than eight points higher than second-place team Russia (176.688) and third-place team China (176.003). Hernandez was the first competitor on vault and floor exercise for the United States team. She contributed to the overall score with 15.100 on vault, 15.233 on beam and 14.833 on floor exercise.

On August 15, during event finals, Hernandez won a silver medal on balance beam with a score of 15.333. She placed ahead of teammate Simone Biles, who placed third with a score of 14.733 after making an error and grabbing the beam, and behind Sanne Wevers of the Netherlands, who won gold with a score of 15.466.

Hiatus 
After the Olympics, Hernandez appeared on the television show Dancing with the Stars. She continued appearing on television and in the media throughout the next four years, as a show host and voice actor as well as a celebrity guest. She returned to gymnastics training in October 2018, after two years off. Although Hernandez previously trained in New Jersey at MG Elite, for her comeback she chose to switch gymnastics clubs and train at Gym-Max in California with coaches Jenny Zhang and Howie Liang. In August 2019, she said that she was training five hours per day, six days a week. Hernandez was invited to the national team training camp held November 15–18, 2019 after spectating at the US Championships in August and speaking to team coordinator Tom Forster while there.

2020 
In January 2020, Hernandez said that she was focusing on meets beginning in late May 2020: the U.S. Classic, USA National Championships, and the US Olympic Trials. Hernandez did not attend the February national team training camp, despite being invited. As the February camp was a selection for spring international meets, Hernandez could not participate in competitions held in March and April 2020. According to team coordinator Tom Forster, Hernandez accepted an invitation to the April camp. On April 29, Hernandez's former coach Maggie Haney was suspended by USA Gymnastics for eight years due to abusive conduct. Hernandez testified against Haney at the USA Gymnastics hearing, and posted a message about her experiences on her social media without naming the coach. Haney publicly humiliated Hernandez for her weight, leading Hernandez to binge and purge. She also forced Hernandez to train and compete while injured. As of 2020, Hernandez still struggles with depression and disordered eating that began due to Haney's abuse. Within the gymnastics community, Haney's suspension was seen as progress for USA Gymnastics, and fans widely supported Hernandez online.

2021 
In February, Hernandez made her return to elite gymnastics at the 2021 Winter Cup, competing in two events. Despite competing a downgraded floor routine, Hernandez managed to hit a clean beam routine to finish fifth on the event behind Skye Blakely, Jordan Chiles, Sunisa Lee, and Konnor McClain.  Hernandez was one of five gymnasts featured on the Peacock docuseries Golden: The Journey of USA's Elite Gymnasts.

In June, Hernandez competed at the 2021 U.S. championships. She competed in beam and vault. Hernandez had to withdraw from the competition after hyperextending her left knee in balance beam warm-ups. Hernandez had her knee heavily wrapped. She was not added to the national team, and she did not qualify to compete at the upcoming Olympic Trials.

Hernandez participated in Simone Biles' Gold Over America Tour in the fall of 2021.

Television roles and media appearances

Dancing with the Stars
Hernandez was revealed as one of the celebrities competing on season 23 of Dancing with the Stars on August 30, 2016. She was partnered with professional dancer Valentin Chmerkovskiy. The couple won the Mirrorball Trophy on the episode that aired November 22, 2016. At 16, Hernandez is currently the show's youngest winner.

In November 2017, Hernandez returned to the 25th season in week eight, to participate in a trio jive with Victoria Arlen and her professional partner Valentin Chmerkovskiy.

Other television roles 
Hernandez was the on-course reporter for American Ninja Warrior Junior from 2018 to 2021.

In 2019 she starred with Daniella Perkins and Jade Pettyjohn in the Nickelodeon animated mini-series Middle School Moguls, voicing a character named Valeria.

She is set to guest star as herself with Dominique Dawes and Gabby Douglas in an episode airing in 2023 of the second season of the Disney+ animated series The Proud Family: Louder and Prouder, judging a gymnastics competition.

Media appearances 
On November 24, 2016, she appeared on the 90th anniversary of the Macy's Thanksgiving Day Parade, riding the Spirit of America float.

From November 24–26, 2017, Hernandez was the special guest narrator for the Candlelight Processional at Epcot Center in Disney World.

Books 
Hernandez released her book I Got This: To Gold and Beyond on January 24, 2017.  In 2018 Hernandez published a similar children's book for younger readers titled She's Got This, with illustrations by Nina Mata.

Competitive history

Honors
In June 2019, Hernandez was inducted into the New Jersey Hall of Fame.
On January 1, 2020, Hernandez was a Grand Marshal of the 2020 Rose Parade.

See also
 List of Puerto Ricans

References

External links 

 
 

2000 births
American female artistic gymnasts
American sportspeople of Puerto Rican descent
Dancing with the Stars (American TV series) winners
Gymnasts at the 2016 Summer Olympics
Junior artistic gymnasts
Living people
LGBT gymnasts
Medalists at the 2016 Summer Olympics
Olympic gold medalists for the United States in gymnastics
Olympic silver medalists for the United States in gymnastics
U.S. women's national team gymnasts
People from Old Bridge Township, New Jersey
Sportspeople from New Brunswick, New Jersey
21st-century American women